James Meek may refer to:

 James Meek (1742–1810), Enlightenment cleric
 James Meek (author) (born 1962), British writer
 James Meek of York (1790–1862), British politician
 James Gordon Meek (born 1968), American journalist